Alexander I the Great (Aleksandre I Didi) (1386 – between August 26, 1445 and March 7, 1446), of the Bagrationi house, was king of Georgia from 1412 to 1442. Despite his efforts to restore the country from the ruins left by the Turco-Mongol warlords and Timur's invasions, Georgia never recovered and faced the inevitable fragmentation that was followed by a long period of stagnation. Alexander was the last ruler of a united Georgia which was relatively free from foreign domination. In 1442, he abdicated the throne and retired to a monastery.

Life 

Alexander was the eldest son of Constantine I of Georgia and his wife Natia, daughter of the Georgian diplomat prince Kutsna Amirejibi. He was brought up by his grandmother (Natia's mother) Rusa (died 1413), an educated and religious noblewoman, who greatly influenced the future king’s preoccupations and his enthusiasm for religious building. 

With his ascension to the throne (1412), Alexander moved to western Georgia and mediated a peace between his vassals, the rival princes of Mingrelia and Abkhazia. Then he, in 1414, met the rebellious prince Atabeg Ivane Jaqeli of Samtskhe on battlefield and forced him into submission. Having dealt with these powerful feudal lords, he, aided by Catholicos Patriarch Shio II, began a program the restoration of major Georgian fortresses and churches. He imposed a temporary building tax on his subjects from 1425 to 1440, but despite the king’s efforts many towns and villages, once flourished, were left in ruin and overgrown by forest. 

In 1431, he re-conquered Lorri, a Georgian marchland occupied by the Kara Koyunlu Turkoman tribesmen of Persia who had frequently raided the southern Georgian marches from there and had even sacked Akhaltsikhe in 1416. Around 1434/5, Alexander encouraged the Armenian prince Beshken II Orbelian to attack the Kara Koyunlu clansmen in Syunik (Siunia) and, for his victory, granted him Lorri under terms of vassalage. In 1440, Alexander refused to pay tribute to Jahan Shah of the Kara Kouynlu. In March, Jahan Shah surged into Georgia with 20,000 troops, destroyed the city of Samshvilde and sacked the capital city Tbilisi. He massacred thousands of Christians, put heavy indemnity on Georgia, and returned to Tabriz.  

In order to reduce the power of frequently rebellious aristocracy, he opposed them by appointing his sons – Vakhtang, Demetre, and George – as his co-rulers in Kakheti, Imereti and Kartli, respectively. This, however, proved to be even dangerous to the kingdom's integrity and the fragile unity kept by Alexander would soon disappear under his sons. For this reason, Alexander the Great is frequently claimed to have disintegrated Georgia and said not to deserve his epithet "the Great" his people bestowed on him. This appellation dates almost from his own day, however, and as the modern Georgian historian Ivane Javakhishvili presumes, might have been related to the large-scale restoration projects launched by the king and his initial success in the struggle with the Turkmen nomads.

As worldly problems overwhelmed his kingdom, Alexander abdicated the throne in 1442 and retired to a monastery under the monastic name of Athanasius.

Marriages and children
He married c. 1411 Dulandukht, daughter of Beshken II Orbelian, by whom he had two sons:
 Vakhtang IV, King of Georgia
 A daughter (c. 1411 – c. 1438) who married, 1425, the emperor John IV of Trebizond
 Demetrius (c. 1413–1453), co-ruler in Imereti; father of Constantine II

Alexander's second marriage with Tamar (died after 1441), daughter of prince Alexander I of Imereti, took place around 1414. Their children were:
 George VIII,  first king of independent Kakheti
 David, Catholicos Patriarch of Georgia consecrated in 1426.
Zaal (born c.1428 – died after 1442), Alexander's fifth son, sixth and last child. He was made a co-king by his father in 1433.

See also 
History of Georgia

Notes

References 

 Ivane Javakhishvili, The History of the Georgian Nation, vol. 3 (1982), Tbilisi State University Press (In Georgian)
 Ronald Grigor Suny, The Making of the Georgian Nation: 2nd edition (December 1994), Indiana University Press, 
 T'oma Metsobeli's History of Tamerlane and His Successors

Kings of Georgia
Eastern Orthodox monarchs
1386 births
1440s deaths
Burials at Svetitskhoveli Cathedral
Bagrationi dynasty of the Kingdom of Georgia
Year of death unknown